The Scottish Junior Cup is an annual football competition organised by the Scottish Junior Football Association. The competition has been held every year since the inception of the SJFA in 1886 and, as of the 2022–23 edition, 108 teams compete in the tournament. The cup has an unseeded knockout format with semi-finals played as single legs, and the final played at a neutral venue of an SPFL club.

Since the 2006–07 season, the winner of the Junior Cup Final has qualified for the following season's senior Scottish Cup. The competition is named the Macron Scottish Cup for sponsorship reasons.

Auchinleck Talbot are the current holders, after defeating Yoker Athletic 2–0 on 4 June 2022 at Rugby Park, Kilmarnock.

Format 
The competition is open to all member clubs of Scottish Junior Football Association, and all tier 6 clubs and below on payment of entry fee, subject to the approval of the committee.

Matches which are tied after 90 minutes proceed directly to penalty kicks, and semi-finals take place as single matches. Prior to the 2020–21 season, drawn matches were replayed and semi-finals took place as two legged ties.

History 
The Cup has been competed for since the 1886–87 season, when Fairfield Govan became the first winners. The SJFA purchased an exact replica in 2007, to replace the original which was showing its age.

Auchinleck Talbot are the most successful club, winning the trophy 14 times to date, including three times in a row from 1986 to 1988 and 2018 to 2022 (no team won in 2020 and 2021 due to the COVID-19 pandemic).

The record attendance for a Junior Cup Final is 77,650 for the 1951 final between Petershill and Irvine Meadow XI.

In 2010, Linlithgow Rose lifted the Scottish Junior Cup for the fourth time in their history and third in a decade. They now join a small group of teams that have managed to lift the cup more than three times.

Sponsorship 
The cup's long-term sponsor, the OVD Rum company, which, as of 2006, had an eighteen-year-long association with the competition, withdrew their backing before the start of the 2006–07 competition. Unlike most other sponsored contests whose names change often, OVD had become so ingrained into the Scottish Junior Cup that it was often simply referred to as the "OVD Junior Cup". The Scottish Junior Football Association announced in 2006 that they would provide the sponsorship and prize money themselves, meaning the cup would be known simply as the Scottish Junior Cup. A new sponsor was found during the 2006–07 competition for the semi-finals and final - Scottish Citylink, a long-distance coach operator. The competition was sponsored by Emirates between 2009 and 2013. The tournament was without a sponsor in 2013–14, with Barr Construction sponsoring the final only, then the SJFA entered a partnership with Dementia Scotland for the latter stages of the 2014–15 competition.

The cup had been without a sponsor since ETHX Energy sponsored the 2015-16 competition, however from 2018, sportswear company Macron has sponsored the tournament.

Finals 

 (R) = Won after a replay/2nd replay.
 (aet) = Result after extra time.
 (P) = Won on penalties.

Club Performance

Clubs which are currently members of the SJFA are indicated in bold.

League Performance

References

External links
 Results of all ties from 1886-1950 at SCOTTISH FOOTBALL HISTORICAL ARCHIVE
 Finals 1887–1956 
 Finals 1957–2009 
 Scottish Junior Football Association
 Scottish Junior Football Association East Region

 
1886 establishments in Scotland
4
Cup
Annual sporting events in the United Kingdom
Annual events in Scotland
Recurring sporting events established in 1886